Naby Capi Soumah (born January 25, 1985) is a Guinean football midfielder who currently plays for Al Fahaheel.

Career
Soumah played for the Tunisian club Sfaxien, having joined the team in 2007 from STIR S Zarzouna. He played the first half year of the year 2009 for Horoya in the Guinée Championnat National and joined in summer 2009 to Liberty Professionals F.C. in Ghana.

International career
He was a part of the Guinean squad at the 2008 African Cup of Nations.
He scored a 6th goal in a 6–1 victory against Botswana in the 2012 Africa Cup of Nations.

Notes

1985 births
Living people
Sportspeople from Conakry
Guinean footballers
Association football forwards
Fello Star players
CS Sfaxien players
Horoya AC players
Liberty Professionals F.C. players
Al-Faisaly FC players
Difaâ Hassani El Jadidi players
Hajer FC players
Al-Nahda Club (Saudi Arabia) players
Burgan SC players
Al-Shabab SC (Kuwait) players
Al-Nasr SC (Kuwait) players
Al-Fahaheel FC players
Guinée Championnat National players
Tunisian Ligue Professionnelle 1 players
Ghana Premier League players
Saudi Professional League players
Botola players
Saudi First Division League players
Kuwait Premier League players
Guinea international footballers
2008 Africa Cup of Nations players
2012 Africa Cup of Nations players
Guinean expatriate footballers
Guinean expatriate sportspeople in Tunisia
Guinean expatriate sportspeople in Ghana
Guinean expatriate sportspeople in Saudi Arabia
Guinean expatriate sportspeople in Morocco
Guinean expatriate sportspeople in Kuwait
Expatriate footballers in Tunisia
Expatriate footballers in Ghana
Expatriate footballers in Saudi Arabia
Expatriate footballers in Morocco
Expatriate footballers in Kuwait